Raulín Rosendo (born August 30, 1957) is a Dominican salsa singer.

Career
Steeped in the rhythms of Afro-Antilles music throughout his childhood, he began his performing career at the age of 12 as a member of the merengue group El Chivo y Su Banda, later appearing with acts including Fernando Villalona, Conjunto Clásico and Los Vecinos. Known as “The Angry Sonero”, Rosendo made his solo debut with 1991's Salsa, Solamente Salsa; by 1993 he was recording in New York City with producer Ricky Gonzalez, scoring the hits Amor en Secreto & Santo Domingo.

Different projects kept Rosendo resurging with success, but in 1995 his record "El Sonero que el Pueblo Prefiere" became the most sold album of the year and, in it was the song "Uno se cura" one of Raulins greatest hits. He was nominated for a Cassandra Award and an A.C.E. Award in New York. The subsequent success of albums including ¡Lo Maximo!, 1996's Dominicano Para el Mundo, 1997's ¡Simplemente! ¡Contrólate! & 1998's Llegó la Ley established him among the biggest salsa performers of the period. Donde Me Coja la Noche followed in 1999.

Discography & videography

Albums
2021: Tranquilo Que Yo Controlo
2006: 
2003: La fama es peligrosa
2002: De aquí pa' allá
2001: En Venezuela
1999: Donde me coja la noche
1998: Llegó la ley
1997: ¡Simplemente! ¡Contrólate!
1996: Dominicano para el mundo
1995: El sonero que el pueblo prefiere
1993: ¡Lo máximo!: El sonero del pueblo
1992: El salsero del pueblo
1992: ¡Que se cuiden los soneros!
1991: Mamá vieja
1991: Salsa, solamente salsa
1988: Salsa con amor

Box set/compilation
2015: Joya de Quisqueya
2002: Historia de éxitos
1999: Non stop doble éxitos '99
1997: El disco de oro

Videos
1997: ¡Simplemente! ¡Contrólate! [Video]
1997: El sonero que el pueblo prefiere [Video]
1997: Dominicano para el mundo [Video]
2004: Lo mejor de lo mejor
2020: No Saben Nada

See also
List of people from the Dominican Republic

References

1957 births
Living people
20th-century Dominican Republic male singers
Salsa musicians
21st-century Dominican Republic male singers